The Province of Georgia (also Georgia Colony) was one of the Southern colonies in British America. It was the last of the thirteen original American colonies established by Great Britain in what later became the United States. In the original grant, a narrow strip of the province extended to the Pacific Ocean.

The colony's corporate charter was granted to General James Oglethorpe on April 21, 1732, by George II, for whom the colony was named. The charter was finalized by the King's privy council on June 9, 1732.

Oglethorpe envisioned a colony which would serve as a haven for English subjects who had been imprisoned for debt and "the worthy poor". General Oglethorpe imposed very strict laws that many colonists disagreed with, such as the banning of alcoholic beverages. He disagreed with slavery and thought a system of smallholdings more appropriate than the large plantations common in the colonies just to the north. However, land grants were not as large as most colonists would have preferred.

Another reason for the founding of the colony was as a buffer state and a "garrison province" which would defend the southern British colonies from Spanish Florida. Oglethorpe imagined a province populated by "sturdy farmers" who could guard the border; because of this, the colony's charter prohibited slavery. The ban on slavery was lifted by 1751 and the colony became a royal colony by 1752.

Foundation

Although many believe that the colony was formed for the imprisoned, the colony was actually formed as a place of no slavery. Oglethorpe did have the vision to make it a place for debtors, but it transformed into a royal colony.  The following is an historical accounting of these first English settlers sent to Georgia:

A committee was appointed to visit the jails and obtain the discharge of such poor prisoners as were worthy, carefully investigating character, circumstances and antecedents.

Thirty-five families, numbering one hundred and twenty persons, were selected.

On the 16th of November, 1732, the emigrants embarked at Gravesend on the ship Anne ... arriving January 13th [1733] in the harbor of Charleston, S. C. ... They set sail the day following ... into Port Royal, some eighty miles southward, to be conveyed in small vessels to the river Savannah.

Oglethorpe continued up the river to scout a location suitable for settlement.  On February 12, 1733, Oglethorpe led the settlers to their arrival at Yamacraw Bluff, in what is now the city of Savannah, and established a camp with the help of a local elderly Creek chief, Tomochichi. A Yamacraw Indian village had occupied the site, but Oglethorpe arranged for the Indians to move. The day is still celebrated as Georgia Day.
  
The original charter specified the colony as being between the Savannah and Altamaha Rivers, up to their headwaters (the headwaters of the Altamaha are on the Ocmulgee River), and then extending westward "to the south seas." The area within the charter had previously been part of the original grant of the Province of Carolina, which was closely linked to Georgia.

Development of the colony

The Privy Council approved the establishment charter on June 9, 1732, and for the next two decades the council of trustees governed the province, with the aid of annual subsidies from Parliament. However, after many difficulties and the departure of Oglethorpe, the trustees proved unable to manage the proprietary colony, and on June 23, 1752, they submitted a deed of reconveyance to the crown, one year before the expiration of the charter. On January 2, 1755, Georgia officially ceased to be a proprietary colony and became a royal colony.

From 1732 until 1758, the minor civil divisions were districts and towns. In 1758, without Indian permission, the Province of Georgia was divided into eight parishes by the Act of the Assembly of Georgia on March 15. The Town and District of Savannah was named Christ Church Parish. The District of Abercorn and Goshen, plus the District of Ebenezer, was named the Parish of St. Matthew. The District of Halifax was named the Parish of St. George. The District of Augusta was named the Parish of St. Paul. The Town of Hardwick and the District of Ogeechee, including the island of Ossabaw, was named the Parish of St. Philip. From Sunbury in the District of Midway and Newport to the south branch of Newport, including the islands of St. Catherine and Bermuda, was named the Parish of St. John. The Town and District of Darien, to the Altamaha River, including the islands of Sapelo and Eastwood and the sea islands north of Egg Island, was named the Parish of St. Andrew. The Town and District of Frederica, including the islands of Great and Little St. Simons, along with the adjacent islands, was named the Parish of St. James.

Following Britain's victory in the French and Indian War, King George III issued the Proclamation of 1763. One of its provisions was to extend Georgia's southern boundary from the Altamaha River to the St. Marys River. Two years later, on March 25, 1765, Governor James Wright approved an act of the General Assembly creating four new parishesSt. David, St. Patrick, St. Thomas, and St. Mary in the recently acquired land, and it further assigned Jekyll Island to St. James Parish.

The Georgia colony had had a sluggish beginning. Those who paid their own way could bring ten indentured servants and would receive 500 acres of land. Additional land could neither be acquired nor sold. Discontent grew in the colony because of these restrictions, and Oglethorpe lifted them. With slavery, liquor, and land acquisition the colony developed much faster. Slavery had been permitted from 1749. There was some internal opposition to slavery, particularly from Scottish settlers, but by the time of the War of Independence, Georgia was much like the other Southern colonies.

Revolutionary War period and beyond

During the American Revolution Georgia's population was at first divided about exactly how to respond to revolutionary activities and heightened tensions in other provinces. When violence broke out in 1775, radical Patriots (also known as Whigs) stormed the royal magazine at Savannah and carried off its ammunition, took control of the provincial government, and drove many Loyalists out of the province. In 1776 a provincial congress had declared independence and created a constitution for the new state. Georgia also served as the staging ground for several important raids into British-controlled Florida.

In 1777 the original eight counties of the state of Georgia were created. Prior to that Georgia had been divided into local government units called parishes. Settlement had been limited to the near vicinity of the Savannah River; the western area of the new state remained under the control of the Creek Indian Confederation.

James Wright, the last Royal Governor of the Province of Georgia, dismissed the royal assembly in 1775. He was briefly a prisoner of the revolutionaries before escaping to a British warship in February 1776. During the American Revolutionary War Wright would become the only royal governor of the Thirteen Colonies to regain control of part of his colony after British forces captured Savannah on December 29, 1778. British and Loyalist forces restored large areas of Georgia to colonial rule, especially along the coast, while Patriots continued to maintain an independent governor, congress, and militia in other areas. In 1779 the British repelled an attack of militia, Continental Army, and French military and naval forces on Savannah. The 1781 siege of Augusta, by militia and Continental forces, restored it to Patriot control. When the war was lost for Britain, Wright and British forces evacuated Savannah on July 11, 1782. After that the Province of Georgia ceased to exist as a British colony.

Georgia was a member of the Second Continental Congress, a signer of the Declaration of Independence, the tenth state to ratify the Articles of Confederation on July 24, 1778, and the fourth state to be admitted to the Union under the U.S. Constitution, on January 2, 1788.

On April 24, 1802, Georgia ceded to the U.S. Congress parts of its western lands, that it had claims for going back to when it was a province (colony). These lands were incorporated into the Mississippi Territory and later (with other adjoining lands) became the states of Alabama and Mississippi.

See also

 Georgia Experiment
 Georgia cracker
 History of Georgia (U.S. state)
 List of colonial governors of Georgia
 Oglethorpe Plan
 Thirteen Colonies

References

Further reading

  Greene, Evarts Boutell.  Provincial America, 1690-1740 (1905) ch 15 online pp 249-269 covers 1732 to 1763.

 McIlvenna, Noeleen (2015). The Short Life of Free Georgia. Chapel Hill, NC: University of North Carolina Press.

External links

LOC: Establishing the Georgia Colony 1732–1750
Carl Vinson Institute of Government, University of Georgia: Georgia History
Sir John Percival papers , also called: The Egmont Papers, 1732–1745. University of Georgia Hargrett Library.
Diary of Viscount Percival  afterwards first Earl of Egmont. University of Georgia Hargrett Library.
Charter of Georgia from the Avalon Project
Royal Charter for the Colony of Georgia, 09 June 1732 from the collection of the Georgia Archives.
 Original Grantees of the Colony of Georgia, 21 December 1733 from the collection of the Georgia Archives.
1758 Act Dividing Georgia into Parishes
Colonial Will Books, 1754-1779 from the Georgia Archives

Province of Georgia
Thirteen Colonies
 
Colonial United States (British)
Former British colonies and protectorates in the Americas
1732 establishments in the British Empire
1776 disestablishments in the British Empire